Bruno Aeberhard (born October 14, 1976) is a Swiss bobsledder who competed from the late 1990s to 2005. He won a bronze medal in the four-man event at the 2000 FIBT World Championships in Altenberg.

References
Bobsleigh four-man world championship medalists since 1930
FIBT profile

1976 births
Living people
Swiss male bobsledders